The Second A. P. Cutter House is a historic house in Arlington, Massachusetts.  It is a -story wood-frame structure that is architecturally transitional, exhibiting Italianate massing with Greek Revival decorations.  It is three bays wide, with pilasters at the corners, and window surrounds with simple brackets.  Its center entrance, now housing two doorways, is sheltered by an Italianate porch with balustrade above.  The house was built c. 1855, and is associated with one of several Ammi Pierce Cutters from the locally prominent Cutter family.  It was converted to a two-family residence in 1949.

The house was listed on the National Register of Historic Places in 1985.

See also
National Register of Historic Places listings in Arlington, Massachusetts

References

Houses on the National Register of Historic Places in Arlington, Massachusetts
Houses in Arlington, Massachusetts